Charles Allen Moser (born 1952) is an American physician specializing in transgender health, a clinical sexologist, sex therapist, and sex educator practicing in San Francisco, California.  He is the author of numerous academic publications and books in the fields of transgender health, paraphilias including BDSM, and sexual medicine.

Early life and education 

Moser obtained his Bachelors of Science degree in physics at the State University of New York at Stony Brook, and a Master's in Social Work at the University of Washington in 1975. He obtained a Ph.D. at the Institute for Advanced Study of Human Sexuality in 1979, and his M.D. at Hahnemann University (Drexel) in Philadelphia. He interned at Mt. Zion and St. Mary’s Hospital in San Francisco.

Career 

Prior to obtaining his M.D. in 1991, Dr. Moser was  a Licensed Clinical Social Worker in California with a private psychotherapy practice specializing in the treatment of sexual issues.
  
Dr. Moser was a Professor and Chair of the Department of Sexual Medicine at the Institute for Advanced Study of Human Sexuality. The IASHS closed in 2018. 

He has authored papers alone and with Peggy Kleinplatz in the area of sex therapy, and the classification of paraphilias. Moser and Kleinplatz argue that paraphilias should be removed from the Diagnostic and Statistical Manual of Mental Disorders (DSM).

Honors 
Moser is an inductee of the Society of Janus Hall of Fame.

Works

Awards 

 2009 SSSS-WR "Outstanding Contributions to Sexual Science" Award

See also 

 Blanchard's typology
 Hypersexual disorder
 Sadomasochism
 Sex reassignment therapy
 Sex therapy
 Sexual diversity
 Sexual dysfunction
 Transvestic fetishism

References 

Living people
1952 births
BDSM writers
Date of birth missing (living people)
Place of birth missing (living people)
American sexologists
Transgender studies academics